Sonia Gomes (Caetanópolis, Minas Gerais,1948) is a contemporary Brazilian artist who lives and works in São Paulo, Brazil. She is known for her mixed media sculptures made of fabric, wires, and other objects that are either found or given to her.

Background 
Sonia Gomes was born in 1948 to a black mother and white father in Caetanópolis, a small town in Minas Gerais considered to be the birthplace of the textile industry in Brazil. Her father's family paid for her education which eventually resulted in a law degree but she credits her grandmother (on her mother's side) with her interest in art. In a 2022 profile in Sculpture magazine she states, "My grandmother was Black; she was a sorceress and would bless people with a branch of a plant called arruda. It was a ritual she would perform, and the memory of it is really strong for me. Since then, I've always been interested in craft - in things made by hand and folk art and the festivals, rituals, churches, and processions." In 1994, after a career in law and at age 45, Gomes turned her attention to art full time, enrolling in the Guignard School of Art in Belo Horizonte, Minas Gerais.

Work 

Gomes combines secondhand textiles with everyday materials, such as driftwood, wire, and furniture to create abstract sculptures. Her compositions stem from a spontaneous and casual practice of deconstructing and re-assembling everyday objects; Lágrima (Tear) (2014), for example, was made with a blue tablecloth that once belonged to her friend's family. Gomes created Correnteza (2018) using found driftwood and fabric forms she stitched to the wood; critic Paul Laster wrote in Sculpture that the juxtaposition of the fabric and wood created "a compelling tension." Gomes' use of secondhand and gifted objects is informed by her decolonial standpoint, and is both a manifestation of Brazil’s rapid and uneven industrial development and a critique of Brazil's culture of wasteful consumption and environmental destruction. She often juxtaposes soft and hard materials, creating movement in her sculptures which alludes to her love of popular Brazilian dances. The artist is represented by Mendes Wood DM, Blum & Poe, and Pace Gallery.

Solo Exhibitions
 Sonia Gomes: O mais profundo é a pele (Skin is the deepest part), Pace Gallery, New York (2022)
 When the sun rises in blue, Blum & Poe, Los Angeles (2021)
 I Rise – I’m a Black Ocean, Leaping and Wide, Museum Frieder Burda and Salon Berlin, Baden-Baden/Berlin (2019)
 Silence of color, Mendes Wood DM, Brussels (2019)
 Still I Rise, MASP – Museu de Arte de São Paulo / Casa de Vidro, São Paulo (2018)
 A vida renasce, sempre, Museu de Arte Contemporânea de Niterói, Rio de Janeiro (2018)

Group Exhibitions
 Gwangju Biennial, Gwangju, Korea (2021)
 Liverpool Biennial, Liverpool, UK (2021)
 Unconscious Landscape – Works from the Ursula Hauser Collection, Hauser & Wirth, Somerset, UK (2019)
 Experimenting with Materiality, Lévy Gorvy, Zurich, Switzerland (2019)
 Histórias Afro-Atlânticas, MASP, São Paulo, Brazil (2018)
 O Triângulo Atlântico, 11ª Bienal de Artes Visuais do Mercosul, Porto Alegre, Brazil (2018)
 Tissage, Tressage, Fondation Villa Datris, L'Isle-sur-la-Sorgue, France (2018)
 Entangled, Turner Contemporary, Margate, UK (2017)
 Revival, The National Museum of Women in the Arts, Washington, USA (2017)
 All the World's Futures 56ª Biennale di Venezia, Venice, Italy (2015)
 The New Afro-Brazilian Hand, Museu Afro Brasil, Sao Paulo (2013)
 Art & Textiles - Fabric as Material and Concept in Modern Art, Kunstmuseum Wolfsburg, Germany (2013)

Critical Reception 
Gomes came to international attention after her inclusion in the 56th Venice Biennale, curated by Okwui Enwezor. In the fall of 2022, Gomes presented a major solo show in New York. The New York Times art critic Jillian Steinhauer expressed her views on the show in early January of 2023. "If Gomes has a central theme, that may be it: a sense of willful connection, a determination to use what’s on hand to forge something unexpectedly beautiful."

Public Collections (selection) 
 Pérez Art Museum Miami
 National Gallery of Art, Washington DC
 Rubell Family Collection
 San Antonio Museum of Art
 Solomon R. Guggenheim
 Tate Modern, London
 Centre Pompidou, Paris
 Museo de Arte Latinoamericano de Buenos Aires (MALBA), Argentina
 Museu Afro Brasil, São Paulo
 Museu de Arte do Rio de Janeiro, Rio de Janeiro
 Museu de Arte de São Paulo
 Pinacoteca do Estado de São Paulo
 Museo Nacional Centro de Arte Reina Sofía, Spain
 Muzeum Susch, Switzerland

References

1948 births
Living people
20th-century Brazilian women artists
21st-century Brazilian women artists
21st-century Brazilian artists
Mixed-media artists
Brazilian contemporary artists